Argonauta sismondai is an extinct species of argonautid octopus. It was described from fossil remains dating to the Pliocene. In terms of eggcase morphology it is considered closest to the extant A. hians.

References

sismondai
Fossil taxa described in 1872